Anastasiou is a Greek surname. Notable people with the surname include:

 Yannis Anastasiou (born 1973), Greek footballer
 Konstadinos Anastasiou (born 1986), Greek sprinter
 Dora Anastasiou, Cypriot beauty queen
 

Greek-language surnames